Sandy Collins (born October 13, 1958) is a retired professional tennis player from the U.S. who played from the late 1970s until 1994.

Collins is a native of San Bernardino, California. Sandy went to Odessa College, where she played tennis for Coach Virginia Brown and the Wranglers. After two seasons, she transferred to the University of Texas of the Permian Basin, where she completed her college career.

During her professional career, she won four doubles tournaments on the WTA tour. Collins spent the next 17 years on the pro tennis tour, beating Billie Jean King in her second year as well as Tracy Austin (then ranked #2 in the world) in the quarterfinals of the German Open. At different times in her career, Collins was ranked as high as 17th in the world in singles and doubles. She became the first tennis player to be endorsed by Oakley Sunglasses. After retirement, Collins coached privately for a time, eventually taking a job at Texas Tech University (1999) as the women's tennis assistant coach and then named head coach in November 2002. She is currently the associate AD/event operations and sports administrator (women's volleyball/men's tennis) at Texas Tech University.

WTA Tour finals

Singles 1

Doubles 18 (4–14)

References

External links 
 
 
 Tennis Magazine 1982
 Profile at Texas Tech athletics

1958 births
Living people
Sportspeople from San Bernardino, California
American female tennis players
Texas Tech Red Raiders women's tennis coaches
Texas Tech University faculty
Odessa College alumni
University of Texas Permian Basin alumni
American women academics
21st-century American women
Tennis people from California
American tennis coaches